(born Osaka, 23 September 1968) is a former Japanese rugby union player who played as a fullback, as well as center and fly-half.

Biography
Maeda attended Shimamoto High School and Kyoto Sangyo University, for whose club he played during the All-Japan Rugby University Championship. After graduating  from Kyoto Sangyo University, he joined NTT Kansai Rugby Football Club.
He also played for Japan, with his first cap being during the match against USA, at Chicago, on 4 May 1991. In the same year, Maeda was called up for the second edition of the Rugby World Cup, although he did not play any match in the tournament. Maeda was last capped for Japan during a match against Tonga, at Nagoya, on 11 February 1995.

Notes

External links
Tatsuya Maeda international stats

http://mediawars.ne.jp/~kimai/rakushi_e.htm

1968 births
Living people
Japanese rugby union players
Rugby union fly-halves
Sportspeople from Osaka Prefecture
Japan international rugby union players